Judith may refer to:

Given name
 Judith (given name), including a list of people and fictional characters

Bible
 Book of Judith, a deuterocanonical book of the Old Testament
 Judith (homily), an Old English homily written by Aelfric of Eynsham around 1000

Art
 Judith (Giorgione), a painting by the Italian painter Giorgione, circa 1504
 Judith (Vouet, Munich), a c.1620–1625 painting by Simon Vouet
 Judith (Vouet, Vienna), a 1620–1622 painting by Simon Vouet
 Judith I, a 1901 painting by Gustav Klimt

Poems
 "Judith" (poem), an Old English poem about the heroine of the Book of Judith
 "Judith", a poem by Patti Smith from her 1972 book Seventh Heaven

Novels
 Judith (novel), a 1978 novel by British author Brian Cleeve
 Judith, a 1978 novel by Aritha Van Herk
 Judith, a 1986 novel by Nicholas Mosley

Theatre
 Judith (Hebbel), an 1841 tragic play by Friedrich Hebbel about the Biblical heroine
 Judith (Giraudoux), a 1931 play by Jean Giraudoux
 Judith, a 1962 adaption of the Giraudoux play by Christopher Fry
Judith, play by Kjeld Abell
 Judith: A Parting from the Body, a 1992 play by Howard Barker

Film and television
 Judith (1923 film), a Dutch film
 Judith (1966 film), set in Palestine shortly before the end of the British Mandate
 Judith (TV series), a 2000 Swedish TV series

Music
  Judith sive Bethulia liberata, H.391 (? mid 1670s) oratorio by Marc-Antoine Charpentier
Judith, cantate by Sébastien de Brossard
Judith (oratorio), a 1761 oratorio by Thomas Arne
 Judith, an 1888 work by Hubert Parry
 Judith (Serov), an 1863 opera by Alexander Serov
 Judith (album), a 1975 album by singer Judy Collins
 Judith (Matthus), a 1985 opera by Siegfried Matthus
 "Judith" (A Perfect Circle song), 2000
 "Judith" (Pat Boone song)

Other uses
 664 Judith, a minor planet orbiting the Sun
 Judith River, Montana
 Judith (ballet), a 1949 ballet by William Schuman
 List of storms named Judith

See also
 Judy (disambiguation)
 Judita, a 1501 Croatian epic poem by Marko Marulić
 Gudit Medieval Ethiopian Queen, likely variant of the same name